G protein-coupled receptor 126 also known as VIGR and DREG is a protein encoded by the ADGRG6 gene. GPR126 is a member of the adhesion GPCR family.
Adhesion GPCRs are characterized by an extended extracellular region often possessing N-terminal protein modules that is linked to a TM7 region via a domain known as the GPCR-Autoproteolysis INducing (GAIN) domain.

GPR126 is all widely expressed on stromal cells. The N-terminal fragment of GPR126 contains C1r-C1s, Uegf and Bmp1 (CUB), and PTX-like modules.

Ligand 
GPR126 was shown to bind collagen IV and laminin-211 promoting cyclic adenosine monophosphate (cAMP) to mediate myelination.

Signaling 
Upon lipopolysaccharide (LPS) or thrombin stimulation, expression of GPR126 is induced by MAP kinases in endothelial cells. During angiogenesis, GPR126 promotes protein kinase A (PKA)–cAMP-activated signaling in endothelial cells. Forced GPR126 expression in COS-7 cells enhances cAMP levels by coupling to heterotrimeric Gαs/i proteins.

Function 
GPR126 has been identified in genomic regions associated with adult height, more specially trunk height, pulmonary function and adolescent idiopathic scoliosis. In the vertebrate nervous system, many axons are surrounded by a myelin sheath to conduct action potentials rapidly and efficiently. Applying a genetic screen in zebrafish mutants, Talbot’s group demonstrated that GPR126 affects the development of myelinated axons. GPR126 drives the differentiation of Schwann cells through inducing cAMP levels, which causes Oct6 transcriptional activities to promote myelin gene activity. Mutation of gpr126 in zebrafish affects peripheral myelination. Monk’s group demonstrated domain-specific functions of GPR126 during Schwann cells development: the NTF is necessary and sufficient for axon sorting, while the CTF promotes wrapping through cAMP induction to regulate early and late stages of Schwann cells development.

Outside of neurons, GPR126 function is required for heart and inner ear development. GPR126 stimulates VEGF signaling and angiogenesis by modulating VEGF receptor 2 (VEGFR2) expression through STAT5 and GATA2 in endothelial cells.

Disease
Mouse models have shown GPR126 deletion to affect cartilage biology and spinal column development, supporting findings that variants of GPR126 have been associated with adolescent idiopathic scoliosis, and Mutations have been shown to be responsible for severe arthrogryposis multiplex congenita

References

External links 
 Adhesion GPCR consortium

G protein-coupled receptors